The 2007 World Table Tennis Championships mixed doubles was the 49th edition of the mixed doubles championship.

Wang Liqin and Guo Yue defeated Ma Lin and Wang Nan in the final.

Seeds

  Wang Liqin /  Guo Yue (champions)
  Ma Lin /  Wang Nan (final)
  Ko Lai Chak /  Tie Ya Na (semifinals)
  Qiu Yike /  Cao Zhen (semifinals)
  Lee Jung-woo /  Lee Eun-hee (third round)
  Werner Schlager /  Liu Jia (third round)
  Joo Sae-hyuk /  Park Mi-young (quarterfinals)
  Oh Sang-eun /  Kim Jung-hyun (quarterfinals)
  Gao Ning /  Li Jiawei (first round)
  Cheung Yuk /  Zhang Rui (third round)
  Leung Chu Yan /  Lin Ling (quarterfinals)
  Seiya Kishikawa /  Ai Fukuhara (third round)
  Lee Jung-sam /  Moon Hyun-jung (third round)
  Yang Zi /  Wang Yuegu (fourth round)
  Xu Xin /  Guo Yan (fourth round)
  Lei Zhenhua /  Ding Ning (fourth round)
  Chuang Chih-yuan /  Huang Yi-hua (third round)
  Yang Min /  Wenling Tan Monfardini (third round)
  Trinko Keen /  Li Jiao (third round)
  Yo Kan /  Ai Fujinuma (third round)
  Christian Süß /  Elke Schall (third round)
  Zhang Chao /  Chen Qing (fourth round)
  Tang Peng /  Jiang Huajun (quarterfinals)
  Ferenc Pazsy /  Georgina Póta (first round)
  Adrian Crișan /  Daniela Dodean (second round)
  Jun Mizutani /  Haruna Fukuoka (third round)
  Petr Korbel /  Renáta Štrbíková (first round)
  Aleksandar Karakašević /  Gabriela Feher (fourth round)
  Patrick Chila /  Carole Grundisch (third round)
  Chiang Peng-lung /  Lu Yun-feng (third round)
  Taku Takakiwa /  Sayaka Hirano (second round)
  Christophe Legoût /  Laurie Phai Pang (second round)

Finals

Main draw

Top half

Section 1

Section 2

Section 3

Section 4

Bottom half

Section 5

Section 6

Section 7

Section 8

References

External links
2007 WTTC Drawsheet - Mixed Doubles

-